Isnapur is a census town in sangareddy district of  patancheru mandal Indian State  Telangana.

Demographics 
 India census, Isnapur had a population of 17564. Males constitute 53% of the population and females 47%. Isnapur has an average literacy rate of 59%, lower than the national average of 59.5%: male literacy is 68%, and female literacy is 49%. In Isnapur, 15% of the population is under 6 years of age.

References 

Villages in Medak district